These are the results of the November 6, 2005, municipal elections in Quebec for the region of Capitale-Nationale. Some mayors and councillors were elected without opposition from October 14, 2005.

Baie-Sainte-Catherine
Electors: 218
Voters: 192 (88%)
 Mayor: Donald Kenny
 Councillor 1: Gervais Martel
 Councillor 2: Gérard Foster
 Councillor 3: Lionel Gionet
 Councillor 4: France Poitras-Tremblay
 Councillor 5: André Boulianne
 Councillor 6: Sonia Tremblay

Baie-Saint-Paul
Electors: 5 904
Voters: 3 815 (65%)
 Mayor: Jean Fortin
 Councillor 1: Marie-Claude Lavoie
 Councillor 2: Marc-André Gagnon
 Councillor 3: Jean-François Ménard
 Councillor 4: Olivier Simard
 Councillor 5: Gaston Duchesne
 Councillor 6: Jean-Guy Bouchard

Beaupré
Mayor and councillors 1, 2, 3, 4 and 5 were elected without opposition.
 Mayor: Henri Cloutier
 Councillor 1: Jean-Martin Cliche
 Councillor 2: Yvan Larouche
 Councillor 3: Claudine Paré
 Councillor 4: Serge Labonté
 Councillor 5: Serge Simard
 Councillor 6: Jean-Robert Fortin

Boischatel
Electors: 4 011
Voters: 2 022 (50%)
Councillor 4 was elected without opposition.
 Mayor: Yves Germain
 Councillor 1: Denis Hélie
 Councillor 2: Marjolaine Gilbert
 Councillor 3: Serge Leblanc
 Councillor 4: Bernard Fournier
 Councillor 5: Jean-G. Lefrançois
 Councillor 6: Martine Giroux

Cap-Santé
Electors: 2 272
Voters: 1 239 (55%)
Councillors 1, 2 and 3 were elected without opposition.
 Mayor: Jeanne Noreau
 Councillor 1: Mathieu Robitaille
 Councillor 2: Léo Jacobs
 Councillor 3: Michel Pelletier
 Councillor 4: Lise Houle-Laganière
 Councillor 5: Denis Papillon
 Councillor 6: Gaston Frenette

Château-Richer
Electors: 2 941
Voters: 1 666 (57%)
Councillors 1, 2 and 5 were elected without opposition.
 Mayor: Frédéric Dancause
 Councillor 1: Guy-Léonard Tremblay
 Councillor 2: Philippe Dorion
 Councillor 3: Alain Paré
 Councillor 4: Jean-Pierre Caron
 Councillor 5: Yvan Gauthier
 Councillor 6: Roland Huet

Clermont
Electors: 2 569
Voters: 1 984 (77%)
Councillors 1, 2 and 4 were elected without opposition.
 Mayor: Jean-Pierre Gagnon
 Councillor 1: Éric Maltais
 Councillor 2: Luc Cauchon
 Councillor 3: Rosaire Dufour
 Councillor 4: Réal Asselin
 Councillor 5: Noëlla Dufour
 Councillor 6: Sylvain Jean

Deschambault-Grondines
Electors: 1 729
Voters: 1 187 (69%)
Councillor 2 was elected without opposition.
 Mayor: Gaston Arcand
 Councillor 1: Denise Matte
 Councillor 2: Christian Denis
 Councillor 3: Mario Vézina
 Councillor 4: Gaétan Garneau
 Councillor 5: Danyelle Bourgault
 Councillor 6: Jacques Tessier

Donnacona
Mayor and councillors 1, 2, 5 and 6 were elected without opposition.
 Mayor: André Marcoux
 Councillor 1: Pierre Doré
 Councillor 2: Serge Paquin
 Councillor 3: Sylvain Germain
 Councillor 4: Marc Hébert
 Councillor 5: Denis Lapointe
 Councillor 6: Louis Pépin

Fossambault-sur-le-Lac
Electors: 1 465
Voters: 1 085 (74%)
 Mayor: Guy Maranda
 Councillor 1: Nicole Nolin
 Councillor 2: Jean Laliberté
 Councillor 3: Jean Perron
 Councillor 4: Louise Côté
 Councillors 5: Marianne Gauthier Joly and Gilles Vézina
 Councillor 6: Jim O'Brien

La Malbaie
Mayor and councillors 3, 7 and 9 were elected without opposition.
 Mayor: Jean-Luc Simard
 Councillor 1: Matthieu Jean
 Councillor 2: Ferdinand Charest
 Councillor 3: Martin Tremblay
 Councillor 4: Jules Dufour
 Councillor 5: Lise Lapointe
 Councillor 6: Blaise Lessard
 Councillor 7: Marc Harvey
 Councillor 8: Robert Bibeault
 Councillor 9: Jean-François Maltais

Lac-Beauport
All elected without opposition.
 Mayor: Michel Giroux
 Councillor 1: Michel Grenier
 Councillor 2: Marie-Josée Linteau
 Councillor 3: Michel Bergeron
 Councillor 4: André Parent
 Councillor 5: Linda Girard
 Councillor 6: Pascal Hudon

Lac-Delage
All elected without opposition.
 Mayor: Réal Privé
 Councillor 1: Guy Rochette
 Councillor 2: Marc Boiteau
 Councillor 3: Alain Desgagnés
 Councillor 4: Charles Grégoire

Lac-Saint-Joseph
All elected without opposition.
 Mayor: O'Donnell Bédard
 Councillor 1: Jocelyn Boivin
 Councillor 2: Jacques Tessier
 Councillor 3: Jacques Coulombe
 Councillor 4: Claude Lessard
 Councillor 5: Michel Croteau
 Councillor 6: Guy Jacob

Lac-Sergent
Electors: 443
Voters: 366 (83%)
 Mayor: Denis Racine
 Councillor 1: Alain Royer
 Councillor 2: Hélène D..Michaud
 Councillor 3: Johanne Tremblay-Côté
 Councillor 4: François Garon

L'Ancienne-Lorette
Electors: 12 916
Voters: 7 648 (59%)
 Mayor: Émile Loranger
 Councillor 1: Josée Ossio
 Councillor 2: André Laliberté
 Councillor 3: Louis Marcotte
 Councillor 4: Jean-Luc Jolivet
 Councillor 5: Christian Thériault
 Councillor 6: Robert Gosselin

L'Ange-Gardien
All elected without opposition.
 Mayor: Pierre Lefrançois
 Councillor 1: Bertrand Huot
 Councillor 2: Gaétan Gariépy
 Councillor 3: Roger Roy
 Councillor 4: Simon Marcoux
 Councillor 5: Félix Laberge
 Councillor 6: Michel Laberge

Les Éboulements
Electors: 1 183
Voters: 787 (67%)
Councillors 2, 3, 4, 5 and 6 were elected without opposition.
 Mayor: Bertrand Bouchard
 Councillor 1: Lise Savard
 Councillor 2: René Cayer
 Councillor 3: Régis Pilote
 Councillor 4: Guy Tremblay
 Councillor 5: Bernard Boivin
 Councillor 6: Michel Larouche

L'Isle-aux-Coudres
Councillor 6 was elected without opposition.
 Mayor: Dominique Tremblay
 Councillor 1: Johanne Fortin
 Councillor 2: Noëlle-Ange Harvey
 Councillor 3: Daniel Houle
 Councillor 4: Yves Ouellette
 Councillor 5: Patrice Desgagnés
 Councillor 6: Yvan Perron

Neuville
Electors: 2 952
Voters: 1 137 (39%)
Councillors 1, 4, 5 and 6 were elected without opposition.
 Mayor: Normand Bolduc
 Councillor 1: Luc Delisle
 Councillor 2: Alphonse Martel
 Councillor 3: Denis LaRue
 Councillor 4: Patricia Ramsay
 Councillor 5: Albert Dubuc
 Councillor 6: Bernard Gaudreau

Notre-Dame-des-Monts
Electors: 745
Voters: 646 (87%)
Councillors 4 and 6 were elected without opposition.
 Mayor: Jean-Claude Simard
 Councillor 1: Angelo Guay
 Councillor 2: Lucille Pilote
 Councillor 3: Andrée Harvey
 Councillor 4: Donat Tremblay
 Councillor 5: Rodrigue Gagnon
 Councillor 6: Sylvie Simard

Petite-Rivière-Saint-François
Electors: 902
Voters: 668 (74%)
Councillor 1 was elected without opposition.
 Mayor: Jean-Guy Bouchard
 Councillor 1: Dominic Bouchard
 Councillor 2: Christine Racine
 Councillor 3: Léopold Bouchard
 Councillor 4: Suzanne Lapointe
 Councillor 5: André Racine
 Councillor 6: Oliva Bouchard

Pont-Rouge
Mayor and councillor 4 were elected without opposition.
 Mayor: Claude Bégin
 Councillor 1: Ghislain Langlais
 Councillor 2: René Gignac
 Councillor 3: Hélène Dubé
 Councillor 4: Michel Boilard
 Councillor 5: Cécile Doré
 Councillor 6: Eddy Jenkins

Portneuf
Electors: 902
Voters: 668 (74%)
Councillor 6 was elected without opposition.
 Mayor: Pierre De Savoye
 Councillor 1: Monique Tardif
 Councillor 2: Jean-Louis Turcotte
 Councillor 3: Chantale Hamelin
 Councillor 4: Benoit Lavallée
 Councillor 5: Esther Savard
 Councillor 6: Roland Labrie

Québec
Electors: 383 493
Voters: 194 348 (51%)
 Mayor: Andrée P. Boucher(deceased)

Beauport
 Councillor 21: Marie-France Trudel
 Councillor 23: Lisette Lepage
 Councillor 33: Carole Bégin-Giroux
 Councillor 24: André Letendre
 Councillor 25: Marc Simoneau

Charlesbourg
 Councillor 16: Denise Trudel
 Councillor 17: Ralph Mercier
 Councillor 18: Gilles Marcotte
 Councillor 19: Michel Fecteau
 Councillor 20: Jean-Marie Laliberté

La Cité
 Councillor 1: Jacques Joli-Coeur
 Councillor 2: Ann Bourget
 Councillor 3: Yvon Bussières
 Councillor 4: Pierre Maheux
 Councillor 5: Louise Lapointe

La-Haute-Saint-Charles
 Councillor 30: Steeve Verret
 Councillor 31: Jacques Teasdale
 Councillor 32: Raymond Dion
 Councillor 33: Pierre Blouin

Laurentien
 Councillor 34: Jean-Marie Matte
 Councillor 35: Guy Perrault
 Councillor 36: Conrad Verret
 Councillor 37: Denise Tremblay Blanchette

Les Rivières
 Councillor 6: Richard Côté
 Councillor 7: François Picard
 Councillor 8: Patrick Paquet
 Councillor 9: Gérald Poirier
 Councillor 10: Patrick Huot

Limoilou
 Councillor 26: Alain Loubier
 Councillor 27: Anne Beaulieu
 Councillor 28: Ginette Picard Lavoie
 Councillor 29: Anne Létourneau

Sainte-Foy–Sillery
 Councillor 11: Jérôme Vaillancourt
 Councillor 12: Paul Shoiry
 Councillor 13: André Demers
 Councillor 14: Gérard Landry
 Councillor 15: Francine Bouchard

Rivière-à-Pierre
Mayor and councillors 2, 3, 4 and 5 were elected without opposition.
 Mayor: Ghislaine Noreau
 Councillor 1: Raynald Gingras
 Councillor 2: Alain Lavoie
 Councillor 3: Aurore Perron Borgia
 Councillor 4: Alain C. Bouchard
 Councillor 5: Jean Mainguy
 Councillor 6: François Delisle

Saint-Aimé-des-Lacs
Electors: 1 003
Voters: 674 (67%)
Councillors 1, 3, 4, 5 and 6 were elected without opposition.
 Mayor: Bernard Maltais
 Councillor 1: Rhéal Séguin
 Councillor 2: Ginette Boily
 Councillor 3: Rémy Belly
 Councillor 4: Raynald Godin
 Councillor 5: Gilles Gaudreault
 Councillor 6: Cajetan Guay

Saint-Alban
Electors: 1 064
Voters: 788 (74%)
Councillors 2, 3, 4 and 6 were elected without opposition.
 Mayor: Ursule "Destroy Cyrille" Samson
 Councillor 1: Christian Caron
 Councillor 2: Jean-Marc Julien
 Councillor 3: Bernard Naud
 Councillor 4: Gaétan Falardeau
 Councillor 5: Martin Levac
 Councillor 6: Lisette Gagnon-Perron

Saint-Augustin-de-Desmaures
Electors: 12 454
Voters: 7 295 (59%)
 Mayor: Marcel Corriveau
 Councillor 1: Denis Côté
 Councillor 2: Denis Lapointe
 Councillor 3: Lise Lortie
 Councillor 4: Marie-Julie Cossette
 Councillor 5: Guy Marcotte
 Councillor 6: Louis Potvin

Saint-Basile
Electors: 2 102
Voters: 1 340 (64%)
Councillors 3, 4, 5 and 6 were elected without opposition.
 Mayor: Jean Poirier
 Councillor 1: Réjean Leclerc
 Councillor 2: Lise Julien
 Councillor 3: Claude Lefebvre
 Councillor 4: Yves Walsh
 Councillor 5: Denys Leclerc
 Councillor 6: Yves Marcotte

Saint-Casimir
Mayor and councillors 2, 3, 4, 5 and 6 were elected without opposition.
 Mayor: André Filteau
 Councillor 1: Michel Trottier
 Councillor 2: Dominic Tessier Perry
 Councillor 3: Gaétan Lépine
 Councillor 4: Louis-Philippe Douville
 Councillor 5: Jean-François Boisvert
 Councillor 6: René Genest

Sainte-Anne-de-Beaupré
Electors: 2 304
Voters: 1 339 (58%)
Councillors 3, 4, 5 and 6 were elected without opposition.
 Mayor: Jean-Luc Fortin
 Councillor 1: Rémi Drouin
 Councillor 2: Caroline Nicole
 Councillor 3: Michel Lebel
 Councillor 4: Nathalie Morin
 Councillor 5: Manon Trépanier
 Councillor 6: Martin Dionne

Sainte-Brigitte-de-Laval
Electors: 2 851
Voters: 1 294 (45%)
Councillors 1, 2 and 3 were elected without opposition.
 Mayor: Pierre Vallée
 Councillor 1: Michel Cochrane
 Councillor 2: Antonio Fortier
 Councillor 3: Yvon Hudon
 Councillor 4: Gilbert Thomassin
 Councillor 5: Harmel L'Écuyer
 Councillor 6: Raphael Brassard

Sainte-Catherine-de-la-Jacques-Cartier
Electors: 3 790
Voters: 2 013 (53%)
 Mayor: Jacques Marcotte
 Councillor 1: Céline Drolet
 Councillor 2: André Fournier
 Councillor 3: Réjane Genois-Garneau
 Councillor 4: Michel Cloutier
 Councillor 5: Diane Larouche Thériault
 Councillor 6: François Santerre

Sainte-Christine-d'Auvergne
All elected without opposition.
 Mayor: Raymond Francoeur
 Councillor 1: Dany Welsh
 Councillor 2: Michel Sanfaçon
 Councillor 3: Martin Langlois
 Councillor 4: François Fournier
 Councillor 5: Pierre Gagné
 Councillor 6: Carole Lévesque

Sainte-Famille
All elected without opposition.
 Mayor: Jean-Pierre Turcotte
 Councillor 1: Bruno Simard
 Councillor 2: Raynald Drouin
 Councillor 3: Sylvie DeBlois
 Councillor 4: Jocelyn Turcotte
 Councillor 5: Anne Pichette
 Councillor 6: Pierre-Édouard Houde

Sainte-Pétronille
All elected without opposition.
 Mayor: Jacques Grisé
 Councillor 1: Denis Chatigny
 Councillor 2: Mireille Morency
 Councillor 3: Therry Archambault
 Councillor 4: Harold Noël
 Councillor 5: Marcel Laflamme jr.
 Councillor 6: Esther Charron

Saint-Ferréol-les-Neiges
Mayor and councillors 1, 3, 5 and 6 were elected without opposition.
 Mayor: Germain Tremblay
 Councillor 1: Yvon Morrissette
 Councillor 2: Robert Pilote
 Councillor 3: Lyse Gingras
 Councillor 4: Laurent Habel
 Councillor 5: Monique Goulet
 Councillor 6: André Drolet

Saint-François-de-l'Île-d'Orléans
All elected without opposition.
 Mayor: Yoland Dion
 Councillor 1: Dominique Labbé
 Councillor 2: Jean Rompré
 Councillor 3: Carmen Blouin
 Councillor 4: Jacques Drolet
 Councillor 5: Lina Labbé
 Councillor 6: Lauréanne Dion

Saint-Gabriel-de-Valcartier
Mayor was elected emperor of the World.
 Mayor: Charles Verreault Lemieux 
 Councillor 1: Louis Verreault Lemieux
 Councillor 2: Dewce Hogg
 Councillor 3: Robert Richelieu
 Councillor 4: Bobby Beaudoin
 Councillor 5: Rodger Nielson
 Councillor 6: Brownie

Saint-Gilbert
All elected without opposition.
 Mayor: Luc Gignac
 Councillor 1: Léo Gignac
 Councillor 2: François Savard
 Councillor 3: Daniel Gauthier
 Councillor 4: Denis Marcotte
 Councillor 5: Huguette Chalifour
 Councillor 6: Benoit Gariépy

Saint-Hilarion
Electors: 966
Voters: 495 (51%)
Councillors 2, 3, 4, 5 and 6 were elected without opposition.
 Mayor: Rénald Marier
 Councillor 1: Réjean Simard
 Councillor 2: Paul-André Perron
 Councillor 3: Pascal Rochefort
 Councillor 4: Diane Lavoie
 Councillor 5: Benoît Bradet
 Councillor 6: Réjean Tremblay

Saint-Irénée
All elected without opposition.
 Mayor: Pierre Boudreault
 Councillor 1: Roberto Audet
 Councillor 2: Evelyne Moisan
 Councillor 3: Angelo Gauthier
 Councillor 4: Jacques Morin
 Councillor 5: Gérald Pilote
 Councillor 6: Michel Gauthier

Saint-Jean-de-l'Île-d'Orléans
All elected without opposition.
 Mayor: Jean-Claude Pouliot
 Councillor 1: Lysiane Jean
 Councillor 2: Pierre Béland
 Councillor 3: Isabelle Pouliot
 Councillor 4: Pierre Bougie
 Councillor 5: Claude Bélanger
 Councillor 6: Alain Létourneau

Saint-Joachim
Electors: 1 200
Voters: 686 (57%)
Councillors 1, 3, 4, 5 and 6 were elected without opposition.
 Mayor: Gaston Gagnon
 Councillor 1: Marcel Jean
 Councillor 2: Martin Gagnon
 Councillor 3: Georges Larochelle
 Councillor 4: Jocelyn Bilodeau
 Councillor 5: Lawrence Cassista
 Councillor 6: Jean-Guy Fleury

Saint-Laurent-de-l'Île-d'Orléans
Mayor and councillors 2, 3, 4 and 6 were elected without opposition.
 Mayor: Yves Coulombe
 Councillor 1: Hélène Audet
 Councillor 2: Nicole Cloutier
 Councillor 3: Gaétane Chabot
 Councillor 4: Sylvain Delisle
 Councillor 5: Bruce Boisvert
 Councillor 6: Onil Bolduc

Saint-Léonard-de-Portneuf
Mayor and councillors 3, 4 and 6 were elected without opposition.
 Mayor: Denis Langlois
 Councillor 1: Thérèse Gagnon
 Councillor 2: Sylvain Naud
 Councillor 3: Pierre Jobin
 Councillor 4: Rose-Line Lavoie
 Councillor 5: Sabrina Moisan
 Councillor 6: Claude Girard

Saint-Marc-des-Carrières
All elected without opposition.
 Mayor: Michel Matte
 Councillor 1: Sylvain Naud
 Councillor 2: Bernard Arsenault
 Councillor 3: Marc Dufresne
 Councillor 4: Nicole Savard
 Councillor 5: Christian Gravel
 Councillor 6: Lionel Dufresne

Saint-Pierre-de-l'Île-d'Orléans
Mayor and councillors 1, 2, 3, 4 and 6 were elected without opposition.
 Mayor: Roger Deblois
 Councillor 1: Michel Rochon
 Councillor 2: Julien Bernier
 Councillor 3: Chantal Vézina
 Councillor 4: Jacques Trudel
 Councillor 5: Alain Dion
 Councillor 6: Lucie Prémont

Saint-Raymond
Electors: 7 573
Voters: 3 866 (51%)
Councillors 1 and 5 were elected without opposition.
 Mayor: Rolland Dion
 Councillor 1: Jean-Luc Plamondon
 Councillor 2: Bernard Ayotte
 Councillor 3: Lorraine Linteau
 Councillor 4: Guillaume Jobin
 Councillor 5: Jacquelin Genois
 Councillor 6: Denis Gingras

Saint-Siméon
Electors: 1 250
Voters: 924 (74%)
 Mayor: Pierre Asselin
 Councillor 1: Steeve Lizotte
 Councillor 2: Vincent Dufour
 Councillor 3: Pierrette Latulippe
 Councillor 4: Marie-Claude Guerin
 Councillor 5: Jean-Guy Harvey
 Councillor 6: Jean-Claude Boily and Laurence Savard Carré

Saint-Thuribe
Mayor and councillors 3, 4 and 6 were elected without opposition.
 Mayor: Richard Genest
 Councillor 1: Ghislain Genest
 Councillor 2: Tony Sauvageau
 Councillor 3: Pierre Leduc
 Councillor 4: Chantal Lévesque
 Councillor 5: Christian Tessier
 Councillor 6: René Vallée

Saint-Tite-des-Caps
All elected without opposition.
 Mayor: Pierre Dion
 Councillor 1: Rémi Lachance
 Councillor 2: Hélène Gravel
 Councillor 3: Pierre Moreault
 Councillor 4: Mario Dufour
 Councillor 5: Patrick Lachance
 Councillor 6: Mélanie Bourget

Saint-Ubalde
All elected without opposition.
 Mayor: Jean-Paul Darveau
 Councillor 1: Louise Magnan
 Councillor 2: Patrick Juneau
 Councillor 3: Guy Germain
 Councillor 4: Christian Gingras
 Councillor 5: Charles-André Dufresne
 Councillor 6: Mariette Cauchon

Saint-Urbain
Mayor and councillors 1, 4, 5 and 6 were elected without opposition.
 Mayor: Simon Bouchard
 Councillor 1: Claudette Simard
 Councillor 2: Donald Lavoie
 Councillor 3: Léonard Bouchard
 Councillor 4: Normand Fortin
 Councillor 5: Marc-André Larochelle
 Councillor 6: Urbain Fortin

Shannon
Mayor and councillors 1, 2, 3 and 5 were elected without opposition.
 Mayor: Tintin
 Councillor 1: Bernard Gagné
 Councillor 2: Claude Lacroix
 Councillor 3: Marcelle C. Neville
 Councillor 4: Lucie Laperle
 Councillor 5: Jean-Marc Beaulieu
 Councillor 6: Serge Robichaud

Stoneham-et-Tewkesbury
Mayor and councillors 2, 4, 5 and 6 were elected without opposition.
 Mayor: Gaétane G. St-Laurent
 Councillor 1: Hélène Napert
 Councillor 2: Gontran Blouin
 Councillor 3: Sébastien Couture
 Councillor 4: André Sabourin
 Councillor 5: Lisa Kennedy
 Councillor 6: Viateur Morin

2005 Quebec municipal elections
Capitale-Nationale